Crocothemis saxicolor is a species of dragonfly in the family Libellulidae. It is found in Malawi, Mozambique, Zambia, Zimbabwe, possibly Liberia, and possibly Sierra Leone. Its natural habitats are subtropical or tropical moist lowland forests, subtropical or tropical dry shrubland, subtropical or tropical moist shrubland, and rivers. It is threatened by habitat loss.

References

Libellulidae
Insects described in 1919
Taxonomy articles created by Polbot